Robert Rodat (born c. 1960) is an American film and television writer and television producer. He was nominated for the Academy Award for Best Original Screenplay for writing Steven Spielberg's war epic Saving Private Ryan.

Career
Rodat wrote Saving Private Ryan (1998), The Comrades of Summer (1992), Tall Tale (1995), Fly Away Home with Vince McKewin (1996), and The Patriot (2000). He worked on the revision of the script for the 2008 film 10,000 BC and helped with the story of 2013 film Thor: The Dark World. Rodat also contributed to a screenplay for a film adaptation of Warcraft, work that was ultimately rebooted with the exit of the film's then-attached director, Sam Raimi.

In 2009, Rodat created the TNT science-fiction series Falling Skies, produced by Steven Spielberg.  The series did not premiere until summer 2011. Its fifth and final season was broadcast in the summer of 2015. The show is about human survivors of a semi-post apocalyptic world due to an alien invasion.

Filmography
The Comrades of Summer (1992, television movie)
Tall Tale (1995)
Fly Away Home (1996)
Saving Private Ryan (1998)
The Patriot (2000)
Thor: The Dark World (2013)
The Catcher Was a Spy (2018)
Kursk (2018)

References

External links
 

Living people
American male screenwriters
American television producers
American television writers
American male television writers
USC School of Cinematic Arts alumni
Year of birth missing (living people)